Zalán Vancsa (born 27 October 2004) is a Hungarian professional footballer who plays as a left winger for Challenger Pro League club Lommel and the  Hungary national team.

Career

MTK 
He debuted in MTK Budapest FC in a 3-1 victory over Újpest FC in the 2020–21 Nemzeti Bajnokság I season on 24 April 2021. On 22 August 2021, he scored his first goal against Újpest at the Szusza Ferenc Stadion in the 92nd minute in the 2021-22 Nemzeti Bajnokság I season. He became the youngest player to score a goal in the Nemzeti Bajnokság I.

Lommel 
On 31 January 2022, he was signed by City Football Group-owned Challenger Pro League club Lommel S.K..

He debuted in Lommel against F.C.V. Dender E.H.  in a 4-1 victory in the 2022–23 Challenger Pro League on 12 August 2022. On 9 September 2022, he played his first match in the 2022–23 Belgian Cup against S.V. Zulte Waregem.

International career
Having represented Hungary at youth international level, Vancsa made his debut for the senior side in June 2022, coming on as a late substitute during a 2–1 loss to Italy in the UEFA Nations League.

Career statistics

.

Personal life
Zalán's father, Miklós Vancsa, is also a footballer. In an interview with RTL Hungary, he said that he moved to Belgium alone.

References

External links

2004 births
Footballers from Budapest
Living people
Hungarian footballers
Hungary youth international footballers
Hungary international footballers
Association football wingers
MTK Budapest FC players
Lommel S.K. players
Nemzeti Bajnokság I players
Challenger Pro League players
Hungarian expatriate footballers
Expatriate footballers in Belgium
Hungarian expatriate sportspeople in Belgium